Bahrain Bayan School (BBS, Madrasat Bayân al-Bahrain), based in Isa Town, Bahrain, is an independent, non-profit, co-educational, bilingual school in Arabic and English, offering preschool through grade 12. Accredited and licensed by the Bahrain Ministry of Education, under Bahraini law, the school provides an American-based and Arabic curriculum, as well as the International Baccalaureate diploma.

History 
BBS was established in 1982 by Dr. May Al Otaibi and Kathleen Acher Kaiksow in response to the need for a bilingual national school on the island of Bahrain. In its first year, the school served students from nursery to kindergarten with 40 students enrolled. The school now has around 1000 students.

In 1986, to accommodate the increasing enrollment, BBS relocated to its present site at the educational district in Isa Town, which was a piece of land granted by Sheikh Isa bin Salman Al Khalifa.

The school introduced to its first batch of senior students, college preparatory courses such as the International Baccalaureate program, and American Diploma to its high school students.  In 1995, BBS gained its accreditation for Preschool to Grade 12. During the same year the school graduated its first senior class with a total of 21 students.

In the academic year of 2011-2012 the school celebrated its 30-year anniversary.

School demographics, accreditation and student achievement 
With a capped total of 1313 students (K-12) due to an academically selective assessment criteria and 249 faculty and staff of 27 nationalities, the Bahrain Bayan School international curriculum and bilingual education are rated “outstanding” by the Bahrain Quality Assurance (BQA), accredited by the Ministry of Education, the International Baccalaureate (IB), and the Middle States Association of Colleges and Schools (MSA).

Bayan students possess language literacy, proficiency and fluency in both Arabic and English, above world average  passing rate on external IB exams, college admissions acceptances from top international universities, and there is a long list of the Crown Prince Annual Scholarship winners, with a track record of alumni appointed in top ranked leading positions on the island.

The Bahrain Bayan School is also a Texas Instruments Training Center, training teachers from the region in using TI products in math, science, and STEM education in addition to its collaboration with the Teachers’ College in the Kingdom of Bahrain providing campus space for training teachers from across the island.

Functional independent units 
Bahrain Bayan School has reformed its independent support units empowered by the senior administration over the years to include clear flow charts within its policies and procedures manual in addition to specialized professionals managing the daily operations of the functional units for the purpose of streamlining workflows and sustaining accountability. Support units include Educational Technology, Media and Events, Human Resources, Finance & Accounts, Procurement, Maintenance, General Services and Registration.

School-wide facilities 
Investments in school wide improvements have been, and continue to be initiated, and the delivery of an equitable professional development program for Faculty and Staff directly linked to the institutional goals, School’s strategic plan cycles, and Staff evaluation continue to be a top priority. Student health, socio-emotional advisory and behavior programs, and student safety procedures and infrastructure, including an elaborate CCTV system, have been implemented alongside the extensive renovation and further development of the facilities and physical plans to support core, special subjects, school-wide events and extracurricular activities. 

Other main School facilities include ten Science Labs, a padel court, six theatres, two soccer fields, two basketball courts, two squash courts, two gymnasiums, three cafeterias, three prayer mosques, one media room, one sound room, a robotics lab, a greenhouse, three infirmaries/isolation rooms with a full medical team which include an in-house school doctor and a team of qualified nurses, a nutritionist, an ERM bookstore, a uniform and souvenir shop and a multi purpose library “Zakat Al Elm'' with an open cinematic projection screen and an outdoor shaded common cafe area for students and parents.  

Moreover, the state of the art Dr. May Bint Sulaiman Al Otaibi Preschool, a green Preschool building built on international standards, is also a second campus inaugurated in 2018, which offers quality education and instills discipline in toddlers in an eco-friendly learning environment, with modern fully equipped facilities such as a gym and a state of the art library. 

The school continues to invest and upgrade its campuses and facilities, and in 2022, the school opened the doors to its new primary campus, which consists of two buildings, a multipurpose examination hall and other facilities. In addition, the new campus has classrooms with support areas, a cafeteria, a multipurpose gym, an infirmary, a music room, an art studio, a computer lab, a bookstore, a library and a soccer field. Within the campus, there is a service area, “Amanat”, which includes multi incubator kiosks, an automated teller machine, international F&B chains and more.

Bayan Care Plan 
The Bahrain Bayan School has offered an insurance plan (the Bayan Care Plan) at no cost to the Bayan parents since 2016. The plan assures that students’ tuition fees (at any point until graduation) are fully covered from the date of enrollment in the case the student's legal guardian dies or becomes totally disabled. Bahrain Bayan School has also extended the insurance cover to include medical and life insurance benefits to all its local and overseas faculty and staff by a Bahraini based company and continues to upgrade its staff remuneration packages.

Educational technology and school communications 
The Educational Technology department provides educational and operational support to all the academic and non academic units. Furthermore, the Educational Technology department in collaboration with the various units has established a tech infrastructure which allows for a seamless virtual transition and communication channels with the Bahraini and Bayan Community during cultural and traditional occasions such as the holy month of Ramadan, Eid celebrations, and the National Day in addition to various updates and announcements which are communicated through various means such as the school website, SMS, emails, social media and the Bayan School app.

Academic and operational initiatives 
Bahrain Bayan School continues to introduce academic and operational initiatives such as the Additional Educational Assistance Unit K-12 (AEA), a counseling unit consisting of educational guidance and socioemotional well being counselors K-12, Life Skills’ program, an Innovation Hub which consists of a highly equipped maker space and an educational platform “Ecolab-360” that earned first place internationally in the Zayed Future Energy Prize from the UAE, an Alumni outreach program and a career development unit. 

Operational and communicational initiatives also include the Bayan On Call hotline to ensure the security of students along with providing parents a point of contact in case of emergencies or inquiries after school hours. Other operational and communication initiatives at Bayan are the Bayan Live Chat, the Educational Resources and Materials bookstore, an online payment method to improve the receivables and increase operational efficiency, and a fully functional BBS phone application to ease communication with students and parents and a streamlined payment mode through using the app or in-person by credit cards or other payment gateways.

Behavioral and advisory programs 
Facilitated by seven school counselors, the school has also introduced a weekly advisory class for its students with a focus on values, emotional health and general ethics, addressing well being issues of interest and classroom discussions that students can relate to in their everyday life. In addition to the advisory classes, the Bahrain Bayan School has clear behavioral disciplinary policies which emphasize on positive discipline.

Career development 
The Bahrain Bayan School has also developed a comprehensive (G1-12) Career Awareness and Development Program designed by key members of specialized college and career guidance staff who assist and guide students through a series of hands-on activities such as career dress up day, interviewing skills, alumni panel live interviews, live sessions with industry professionals from different government departments, ministries and institutions, international and local college fairs, in addition to various classroom activities. 

The career development program is primarily designed to provide students with career awareness, college guidance, self development, and career decision making skills where students are advised in making academic and future career plans which cater for the needs of the Bahraini market.

Sports and extracurricular activities 
The Bahrain Bayan School delivers an all-encompassing physical education curriculum that challenges all students to become lifelong physical learners, whilst educating the next generation on how to live a healthy active lifestyle for the future and creating successful and competitive school sports teams with a two-pronged focus: achieving a high level of success domestically in the Kingdom of Bahrain and representing local talent internationally through junior sports competitions and tournaments.

In addition to the sports activities that the school offers to its students, the primary and higher grades also offer a selection of after school activities which include chess clubs, drama and performance classes, cooking lessons, mechanics, arts and crafts, math clubs and more.

Local programs and collaborations 
As part of embedding the Bahraini roots and promoting collaborative society work, the School has engaged in several community service initiatives and programs. With the support of various financial institutions and other organizations to support this national initiative, Bahrain Bayan School has launched in 2022 one of the pioneering national programs “Estedama for the Retirees” where the school would advertise for various positions and create a centralized database which can then be shared with other schools and institutes to benefit from the skills and experiences of Bahraini retirees who are willing to give back to the community through providing the service which is more relevant to their skill. 

The school continues to collaborate with the Ministry of Labor in the hiring of candidates registered through the National Program for the Unemployed to support the employment of Bahrainis. In addition to that, it continues to invest in professional development and collaborate with the Ministry of Education and the University of Bahrain for registering faculty and staff to attend various workshops and courses such as obtaining the Teaching Certificate.

Student local and international field trips have also been revamped in nature to support learning and be driven by various community service activities such as visits to the United Nations and World Health Organization offices to meet with officials from the World Economic Forum and engage in various discussions on a global level. This is in addition to a variety of trips on the island visiting community service centers and government entities.

Gallery

External links 
 Official website

See also 

 List of schools in Bahrain

References 

Schools in Bahrain
International schools in Bahrain
International Baccalaureate schools in Bahrain
Educational institutions established in 1982
Isa Town
1982 establishments in Bahrain